Maysuryan is a surname. Notable people with the surname include:

Alexander Maysuryan (born 1969), Russian author and political activist
Nikolay Maysuryan (1896-1967), Soviet scientist, Academician of the VASKhNIL

Russian-language surnames